The Rose of the Year is a prestigious rose award is given annually by the British Association of Rose Breeders. From 1982 to 2001, the British Association of Rose Breeders and the British Group of the HTA granted the title Rose of the Year. Between 1984 and 2001, the title Best of the Best was granted if the selected rose was an established cultivar, which remained popular over several years. Since 2002, the title Best of the Best is granted.

List

See also 
 Garden roses
All-America Rose Selections
American Garden Rose Selections
List of Award of Garden Merit roses

References

Plant awards